Tomi Ilic is a celebrity hair stylist and film producer working in Encino, California.

Career

Born Tomislav Ilić in Ivankovo, Croatia, yugoslavia to parents Franjo and Ana Ilić, Tomi was educated in Vienna Austria. His father Franjo was known to have ties to the Eastern European mob, though his parents separated when he was 12.  Participating in many sports in his youth, such as gymnastics, hockey, soccer, he discovered his true passion – weightlifting and became Mr. Vienna Jr. in 1985.
 
In 1988, he qualified for the European Championship but had to sit it out due to a shoulder injury. Moving to California in 1990, he began a new career as a celebrity hairstylist .
 
Tomi is the founder of Hair Religion, a hair appliance company specializing in custom made hair dryers. While shooting a commercial for a Dutch cable network, he was asked by a friend if he would be interested making movies.  Two months later, he was on his own movie set as Tomi Ilic Films.  He produced the feature film Blue Dream starring James Duval, Dominique Swain, and Kayden Kross.
 
Tomi has two sons, Mateo, born in 1995, and Dante, born 1997.

External links

Hair Religion site
Tolucan Times Interview
Sundance Film Festival Article

American film producers
Living people
Hairdressers
Year of birth missing (living people)
Yugoslav emigrants to the United States
Yugoslav expatriates in Austria